Cycloheptatrienemolybdenum tricarbonyl is the organomolybdenum compound with the formula (C7H8)Mo(CO)3. It is a red-orange solid that is soluble in nonpolar organic solvents. The compound has no practical value but is a prototypical complex of cycloheptatriene.

Synthesis, structure, and reactions
The compound is prepared by thermal reaction of the triene with molybdenum hexacarbonyl:
C7H8 + Mo(CO)6 → (C7H8)Mo(CO)3 + 3 CO

The compound is a piano stool complex, consisting of Mo(CO)3 bound to six carbon centers of the triene. The methylene group projects from the plane of the six coordinated carbon atoms.

The compound reacts with trityl salts to give the cycloheptatrienyl complex:
(C7H8)Mo(CO)3 + (C6H5)3C+ → [(C7H7)Mo(CO)3]+ + (C6H5)3CH

References

Organomolybdenum compounds
Carbonyl complexes
Cycloheptatrienyl complexes
Half sandwich compounds
Molybdenum(0) compounds